The Brando is a private resort located on the atoll of Tetiaroa in French Polynesia. The Brando serves as a regulated airstrip, research facility, eco-resort and spa on the Motu of Onetahi. The resort consists of 80 staff and facilities management personnel. The atoll's inside on which The Brando is located is on a 99-year lease contracted by Marlon Brando.

Travel
Traveling to The Brando can only be commercially done by air. Air Teti'aroa flies private planes between the island of Tahiti and Teti'aroa. The airline's departure is located in a private terminal at the Fa'a'ā International Airport in Tahiti.
Air Tetiaroa rates to The Brando Resort on Tetiaroa fluctuate with the regular, high and festive seasons.

History 
Construction of The Brando Resort began in 2009 by Teti'aroa Pacific Beachcomber SC. In September 2010 Pacific beachcomber announced it was investing US$60 million in construction. The first phase of the building included repairing the airstrip runway for smoother plane landing and lengthening the tarmac to meet current aviation standards. Additionally, a reef dock was constructed to enable shipments from the ocean to the lagoon side of the reef.

In February 2014, it was announced that construction on The Brando Resort was officially completed. In July 2014, The Brando was officially open to the public. Eight of Marlon Brando’s eleven children were involved in the project along with the Brando Estate.

In November 2015 the resort took a local man to court in an effort to have him barred from living in a boat in the lagoon.

In October 2016 the resort was named the world's best resort by Conde Nast.

Ecology
The buildings are made using materials that are of local or certified origin, renewable, or recycled. There is a deep seawater air-conditioning (SWAC) system to reduce energy demands.
Renewable energy sources such as solar power (from PV panels) and coconut oil (biofuel) are used.
The zinc-bromine flow batteries (used for storing the power from the PV panels) are made from recyclable materials.
The resort's vehicles are electric or human-powered.

References

External links 
 The Brando Tahiti
 The Brando Rates
 The Brando Teti'aroa resort web site

Marlon Brando
Ecological economics
Natural resource management